"The Trouble with Grandpa" is a 1982 episode of the syndicated American religious-themed anthology television series Insight starring Elisha Cook Jr. and Meg Tilly (in her television debut). The episode was produced in 1981 by Paulist Productions and originally aired on January 21, 1982, as a presentation of Capital Cities Family Specials.

Plot
The relationship between a 17-year-old girl named Dori (Meg Tilly) and her 75-year-old grandfather "Grampa" (Elisha Cook Jr.) living in a trailer by the sea. Dori, who has lost her parents, is very insecure and believes herself to be plain, inept and friendless, while her grandfather is active and loves to swim. Together, they are two lonely people both dependent upon each other – he worries about her and she worries about him. When her grandfather soon begins to show signs of senility, Dori must face the possibility of him becoming ever more dependent upon her. She rises to the challenge, getting a new appreciation of herself in the process.

Cast
Elisha Cook Jr. as Grandpa
Meg Tilly as Dori
Millie Perkins as Dr. Langly
Lee Lucas as Paul

References

External links
 

1982 American television episodes
Television episodes about families
Works about old age
Works about adolescence